The Glisborn, or Glißborn, is a small, short stream that rises from a spring of the same name. The spring is located close to the Odenberg hill near Gudensberg in the northern Hessian district of Schwalm-Eder-Kreis. The spring is connected with numerous legends (see below).

Course 
The spring water flows directly in to a large pool (see photo) before emptying into the stream. This gives an average gradient of 1.7%.

Legends 
The first written versions of legends about the Glisborn were recorded by the Brothers Grimm.

It is, however, most probable that this legend is based on an older Chatti legend which states that the god Odin came riding from the Odenberg on his white, eight-legged horse Sleipnir. At every hoof-fall of the horse, a spring arose, such as the Glisborn.

For this reason the Chatti held the Glisborn sacred. After the Chatti were Christianised in the 8th Century by Saint Boniface, the legend was changed to the Charlemagne story. Both variants of the legend are "supported" by a stone with the imprint of a horse's hoof that was embedded in the wall of a church (Karlskirche) in Karlskirchen, a long abandoned village nearby.
During the Protestant Reformation in the Landgraviate of Hesse in the year 1526, the church was destroyed because it was also still used for certain pagan practices. Many years later this stone was cemented into the wall that surrounds the St. Margarethen church  in Gudensberg, where it can be still seen today.

Water quality 

In 2010, the water at Glisborn was found to have a total nitrate content above 50 mg/L, which is the maximum value that is allowed in drink water by German law (Trinkwasserschutzverordnung) and European drinking water quality standards.
The Hessian Water Authority have stated that in a study from 1994 it was found that the soil around Glisborn is composed of thick loess deposits in various states of weathering. The high nitrate values are caused by natural loess decomposition and are not due to farming practice.

See also
List of rivers of Hesse

References 

Rivers of Hesse
Springs of Germany
Rivers of Germany